The 1971–72 Drexel Dragons men's basketball team represented Drexel University during the 1971–72 men's basketball season. The Dragons, led by 1st year head coach Ray Haesler, played their home games at the 32nd Street Armory and were members of the University–Eastern division of the Middle Atlantic Conferences (MAC).

The team finished the season 11–14, and finished in 4th place in the MAC University–Eastern Division in the regular season.

On January 5, 1972, Steve Lilly set the Drexel team record for most rebounds in a single game, recording 30 rebounds against Muhlenberg.  He also set Drexel records at the time for rebounds in a season (327) and career (749).

Roster

Schedule

|-
!colspan=9 style="background:#F8B800; color:#002663;"| Regular season
|-

References

Drexel Dragons men's basketball seasons
Drexel
1971 in sports in Pennsylvania
1972 in sports in Pennsylvania